Chaf-e Bala (also Romanized as Chāf-e Bālā; also known as Bālā Chāf and Chāf) was a village in Chaf Rural District, in the Central District of Langarud County, Gilan Province, Iran. At the 2006 census, its population was 508, in 159 families.  
It was merged into the city of Chaf and Chamkhaleh.

References 

Populated places in Langarud County
Former populated places in Gilan Province